Fancy Dress is a 2019 Indian Malayalam Language comedy film directed by Ranjith Saccariya and produced by Guinness Pakru. The film starring Guinness Pakru, Swetha Menon and Kalabhavan Shajon was released on 2 August 2019. The film had musical score composed by Ratheesh Vega.

Cast
 Guinness Pakru as Dikru/Ben
 Hareesh Kanaran as Sebastian/Seban
 Swetha Menon as Priya
 Kalabhavan Shajon as Nandhan Police Officer
 Sowmya Menon as Tessa
 Jayan Cherthala as Devarajan Police Officer
 Bala Kumar as Gabriel
 Bijukuttan as Lalu Security guard
 Sudheer Karamana as Sreedharan
 Santhosh Keezhattoor as Martyn Police Officer 
 Saju Navodaya as Jomon
 Ponnamma Babu as Cicily
 Kottayam Pradeep as Prabha Varma
 Majeed as Anandan
 Gemini Kottayam as Abraham
 Joy as Gokul
 Thesni Khan as Parvathy
 Kathir as Jobin
Suraj Venjaramoodu  (Cameo Appearance)
Sarayu Mohan  (Cameo Appearance)

Soundtrack 

 Ullilie Moham Kunnolam by Niranj Suresh
 Aattam Maarattam by Vijay Yesudas

Marketing and release
The official teaser was launched on 4 July 2019 and the film was released on 2 August 2019.

Reception 
Anna Mathews of Times of India noted slow pacing in parts of the film and described the comedic elements as "thin".

References

External links
 

2019 films
Indian comedy films
2010s Malayalam-language films
2019 comedy films